Strange Visitor is a fictional character appearing in American comic books published by DC Comics. She first appeared in Superman (vol. 2) #149 and was created by Randall Frenz and Ron Frenz.

Fictional character biography
Because of a lightning strike on a plane, the cosmic entity Kismet and Sharon Vance (Clark Kent's childhood friend from Smallville) became one entity known as the Strange Visitor. She had become a being of pure electromagnetic energy, and was drawn to the laboratories of Professor Emil Hamilton, who still had one of Superman's containment suits (from a period when he was temporarily converted to electromagnetic energy). Emil modified the suit to fit her since test results showed that her energy field was dissolving, and the suit would help her maintain solid form. Her memories were weak, and even though she easily used her powers to magnetically levitate trains over destroyed tracks, destroy alien attackers with an electromagnetic pulse, and absorb the powers of a self-proclaimed "god of war", she still wasn't sure who she really was.

Even more disturbing was the fact that her emotional state was affecting her powers, and when she became angry or upset, her power levels surged to the point where her containment suit was almost unable to handle all of the energy. If the suit were to fail, she would lose her physical form. A battle with the Parasite restores her powers and her memories.

She later went on to become a hero in her own city where she fought Gorilla Grodd in New York, but was accused of attacking a "monkey".

In Batman: Our Worlds at War (Aug 2001), it is seen that a facility under control of Lex Luthor is keeping tabs on her.

When the Imperiex fleet attacks Earth, Strange Visitor gives all of her powers to Superman to give him the necessary power boost to defeat Imperiex. He defeats the powerful entity by cracking his armour and draining his energy, an act which ended her life (although she noted that 'Sharon Vance' had died when she was created and what was left to form Strange Visitor was just the essence of Sharon giving her a personality), while opening the way for Superman to vanquish Imperiex and save the universe.

Powers and abilities
Strange Visitor is connected to the Earth's geomagnetic field, and has the power to manipulate electromagnetic energies, which enables her to fire blasts of electrical energy from her hands or eyes, generate magnetic fields to move, lift, and manipulate metal objects, create force fields, steal energy from others, and even "read" an object's magnetic field.  She also has the power to fly at near light speeds, lower her density to walk through solid matter, and telepathically sense emotions.

In other media
Sharon Vance appears in the Young Justice episode "True Colors", voiced by Masasa Moyo. This version does not have powers, and appears as a tour guide at a LexCorp farming facility.

References

Comics characters introduced in 1999
DC Comics characters who can move at superhuman speeds
DC Comics superheroes
DC Comics characters who have mental powers
DC Comics telepaths
Fictional characters who can turn intangible
Fictional characters with metal abilities
Fictional characters with electric or magnetic abilities
Fictional characters with density control abilities
Fictional empaths
Superman characters
Characters created by Ron Frenz
DC Comics female superheroes